Hey Good Looking! (original title: Comme t'y es belle !) is a 2006 French comedy film directed by Lisa Azuelos.

Plot
Isa, Alice, Léa and Nina are friends and share their disappointments in love, work and family issues. United by the Sephardic Jewish religion and their families, they must deal with traditions and needs of modern life. Marrying an employee to arrange for French nationality, manage tax audits, raise children, participate in family gatherings and follow her diet ... Small hassle and big problems mingle with the story.

Cast

 Michèle Laroque as Isa
 Aure Atika as Léa
 Valérie Benguigui as Alice
 Géraldine Nakache as Nina
 Marthe Villalonga as Liliane
 Francis Huster as David
 Alexandre Astier as Gilles
 Thierry Neuvic as Michel
 Andrew Lincoln as Paul
 Dora Doll as Mémé
 Frédéric Beigbeder as Ivan
 Aurore Auteuil as Carole
 David Kammenos as Simon
 Amel Djemel as Latifa
 Macha Béranger as Aunt Régine
 Farida Ouchani as Fatima
 Idit Cebula as Maggie
 Simone Lankar as Tata Fréha
 David Elmaleh as Serge
 Nikita Lespinasse as Suzie
 Judith Aknine as Madame Benaroche
 Stéphane Foenkinos as Samy
 Hubert Benhamdine as Pierre
 Xavier Briere as Inspector Belvaux
 Yassine Baataoui as Hamadi
 Zara Guebli as Latifa's mother
 Richard Medkour as Gérard
 Stéfano Boullet as Samuel
 Gabrielle Lopes Benites as Emilie
 Marlon Chappat as Ilan
 Oriane Deschamps as Laura
 Frankie Wallach as Kim
 Camille Neyens as Joséphine
 Lola Martiniv as Lou
 Hervé Louis as Chamallow
 Manu Payet as The Man at the synagogue
 Nelson Monfort as The commentator

References

External links

2006 films
2000s French-language films
2000s buddy comedy films
2000s female buddy films
French buddy comedy films
Films directed by Lisa Azuelos
2006 comedy films
2000s French films